Palmyra is an unincorporated community in Lee County, in the U.S. state of Georgia.

History
The community was named after the ancient city of Palmyra, in Syria. The Georgia General Assembly incorporated Palmyra as a town in 1840.

With the construction of the railroad through the area and concerns that the community's low elevation was prone to mosquito-borne diseases, business activity shifted to nearby Albany, and the town's population dwindled. The Palmyra post office closed in 1891. The town's municipal charter was repealed in 1995.

References

Former municipalities in Georgia (U.S. state)
Unincorporated communities in Lee County, Georgia
Populated places disestablished in 1995